La Porxada is a 16th-century corn exchange (llotja) in the Catalan town of Granollers, near Barcelona.  It was declared to be an official artistic and historical monument (MHA) in 2006.

References

Further reading

Buildings and structures in Catalonia
Granollers